Khenichet is a town in Sidi Kacem Province, Rabat-Salé-Kénitra, Morocco. According to the 2004 census it has a population of 7,936.

References

Populated places in Sidi Kacem Province